The Corviglia Ski Club is a recreational snow sports club located in Corviglia, Switzerland. It was founded in 1930 by European aristocrats and is one of the oldest and most famous private members club in the world - exclusively for the rich and the famous.

History 
The Corviglia Ski Club was created on 1930. Founder members included:
 Coco Chanel
 Jacques Cartier
 Philippe de Rothschild

Presidents 
Teofilo Guiscardo Rossi di Montelera
 Sua Eccellenza l’Ambasciatore don Augusto Ruffo di Calabria dei Principi di Scilla

Notable members 
Aga Khan IV, magnate
Rainier III, Prince of Monaco
Gianni Agnelli, Italian industrialist and politician
Umberto Agnelli, Italian industrialist and politician
Hans Heinrich Thyssen-Bornemisza, industrialist and art collector
Aristotle Onassis, industrialist
Freddy Heineken, Dutch businessman
Prince Alexander of Yugoslavia
Frank Jay Gould, philanthropist
Herbert von Karajan, Austrian conductor.
Harry Hays Morgan Jr.,  American diplomat
Emilio Pucci, Italian fashion designer and politician
Philippe de Rothschild, 
Jacobo Fitz-James Stuart, 17th Duke of Alba
Stavros Niarchos, Greek shipping tycoon
John Spencer-Churchill, 11th Duke of Marlborough
Alfonso, Duke of Anjou and Cádiz
Prince Constantin of Liechtenstein
Riccardo di Sangro e di Martina

References

Ski clubs
Skiing in the Alps